The UK R&B Chart is a weekly chart that ranks the 40 biggest-selling singles and albums that are classified in the R&B genre in the United Kingdom. The chart is compiled by the Official Charts Company, and is based on physical and other physical formats. This is a list of the UK's biggest R&B hits of 2005.

Number ones

See also
List of UK Dance Singles Chart number ones of 2005
List of UK Independent Singles Chart number ones of 2005
List of UK Singles Downloads Chart number ones of the 2000s
List of UK Rock & Metal Singles Chart number ones of 2005
List of UK R&B Albums Chart number ones of 2005

References

United Kingdom RandB Singles
2005
2005 in British music